Eugene Edward Lee (March 9, 1939 – February 6, 2023) was an American set designer who worked in film, theater, and television. He was the production designer for Saturday Night Live  from the show's premiere in 1975 until his death, with the exception of seasons 6-10 (1980-1985). Lee became resident designer at Trinity Repertory Company in Providence, Rhode Island, in 1967.

Life and work
Eugene Edward Lee was born in Beloit, Wisconsin. He attended Beloit Memorial High School, had a BFA each from the Goodman School of Drama at the Art Institute of Chicago (now at DePaul University) and Carnegie Mellon University, an MFA from the Yale School of Drama and three honorary Ph.Ds. He won Tony Awards for Candide, Sweeney Todd, and Wicked, as well as the Drama Desk Award for Outstanding Set Design. Lee's other New York theatre work included on Amazing Grace, Alice in Wonderland, The Normal Heart, Agnes of God, Ragtime, Uncle Vanya, Ruby Sunrise, Bounce, and A Number. His film credits include Coppola's Hammett, Huston's Mr. North and Malle's Vanya on 42nd Street. 

His work on the musical Candide at the Chelsea Theater Center of Brooklyn and on Broadway are chronicled in great detail in Davi Napoleon's book, Chelsea on the Edge: The Adventures of an American Theater. The book also describes his work on Slave Ship and other productions at the Chelsea.

Personal life and death
During the 1970s, Lee was in a relationship with fellow designer Franne Lee. In 1981, he married Brooke Lutz. Lee had one son from each relationship. He was a decades-long resident of Providence, and while working on Saturday Night Live, he commuted to New York City from Rhode Island during the week and stayed at The Yale Club.

Lee died in Providence on February 6, 2023, at the age of 83.

Honors
Lee was inducted into the American Theater Hall of Fame in 2006.

References

External links
 

 
 Interview with Eugene Lee about his work in the regional and Broadway theater
 Description of a production of an O'Neill play with special attention to Eugene Lee's design.
 Description of a musical by Stephen Sondheim with special attention to Eugene Lee's design.
 Eugene Lee Set design drawings, 19--, held by the Billy Rose Theatre Division, New York Public Library for the Performing Arts

1939 births
2023 deaths
American production designers
American scenic designers
Brown University faculty
Carnegie Mellon University College of Fine Arts alumni
Helpmann Award winners
Obie Award recipients
People from Providence, Rhode Island
People from Wisconsin
Primetime Emmy Award winners
Tony Award winners
Yale School of Drama alumni